Journal of Labor and Society, formerly Working USA: The Journal of Labor and Society, is a quarterly peer-reviewed academic journal published by Brill covering the political economy of labour, labor movements, and class relations throughout the world. The journal is published in print and online. It focuses on the current context and shape of capitalist social relations, business and corporations, labor relations, the working class and the labor unions in the Global South. The journal encourages submissions on the political economy of imperialism, global inequality and poverty, labor and the right wing, and political movements. The journal was established in 1997 and published by Wiley Periodicals through December 2020.  In January 2021, Journal of Labor and Society begins publishing with Brill. The editor is Immanuel Ness. The title reflects the journal's commitment to publishing peer-reviewed scientific research into the social, political, economic, and cultural conditions faced by workers worldwide. Its editorial office is located within the Graduate Center for Worker Education at Brooklyn College of the City University of New York. It is a member of the Committee on Publication Ethics.

Abstracting and indexing 
The journal is abstracted and indexed by:
 Scopus
 Business ASAP
 Expanded Academic ASAP
 InfoTrac
 PAIS: Public Affairs Information Service

External links 
 

Quarterly journals
Labour journals
Publications established in 1997
English-language journals
Brill Publishers academic journals